Sonia Kathleen Hornery (born 4 December 1961) is an Australian politician representing the seat of Wallsend in the New South Wales Legislative Assembly for the Labor Party. She has been in Parliament since 24 March 2007.

Early life
Hornery grew up in Windale and Edgeworth living in Housing Commission housing, before moving to rented accommodation in Wallsend and West Wallsend.

She attended Newcastle University and studied teaching. She later returned and obtained a Bachelor of Arts, with Honours, in history.

Her first teaching appointment was to Walgett High School. She then taught at Kempsey High School and other schools around the Hunter Region.

In 2002 she was elected to Newcastle City Council.

Parliamentary career
She was elected to the New South Wales Parliament in 2007. On 8 May 2007 she was appointed parliamentary secretary assisting the Minister for Transport but was demoted on 16 November 2009 as a parliamentary secretary, for opposing the Premier Nathan Rees on privatisation of public owned assets in her electorate, and campaigning within the Labor Party caucus to replace Nathan Rees as Premier of New South Wales.

On 26 July 2017, the New South Wales Electoral Commission announced it had laid a charge against Hornery for using electoral information in a manner contrary to that permitted under section 42(1) of the Parliamentary Electorates and Elections Act 1912, however the charge was withdrawn on 25 September 2017.

References

 

1961 births
Living people
Members of the New South Wales Legislative Assembly
Australian Labor Party members of the Parliament of New South Wales
University of Newcastle (Australia) alumni
Australian schoolteachers
Labor Left politicians
People from Newcastle, New South Wales
21st-century Australian politicians
Women members of the New South Wales Legislative Assembly
21st-century Australian women politicians